Horst Nemec (25 January 1939 – 23 June 1984) is an Austrian football forward who played for Austria in the 1960 European Nations' Cup. He also played for FK Austria Wien.

References

External links
 
 

1939 births
1984 deaths
Austrian footballers
Austria international footballers
Association football forwards
FK Austria Wien players
First Vienna FC players